Omar Mbapandza (born 9 April 1997) is a Comoran international footballer who plays as a defender for Championnat National 2 side Athlético Marseille and the Comoros national football team.

International career
Mbapandza was first called up to the Comoros senior squad in May 2016. He made his debut in qualification for the 2017 Africa Cup of Nations, playing 90 minutes in a 1-0 defeat by Burkina Faso.

Goal.com reported that Mbapandza played in the final qualification game; a 1-0 loss to Uganda, however the official CAF website states that he did not play in that game.

Career statistics

Club

Notes

International

References

1997 births
Living people
Comorian footballers
Comoros international footballers
French footballers
French sportspeople of Comorian descent
Association football defenders
AC Ajaccio players
Championnat National 3 players
Footballers from Marseille